The 1992–93 Drexel Dragons men's basketball team represented Drexel University  during the 1992–93 NCAA Division I men's basketball season. The Dragons, led by 2nd year head coach Bill Herrion, played their home games at the Daskalakis Athletic Center and were members of the North Atlantic Conference (NAC).

The team finished the season 22–7, and finished in 1st place in the NAC in the regular season.

Roster

Schedule

|-
!colspan=9 style="background:#F8B800; color:#002663;"| Regular season
|-

|-
!colspan=9 style="background:#F8B800; color:#002663;"| NAC tournament
|-

Awards
 Bill Herrion
North American Conference Coach of the Year
NAC Player of the Week (2)

 Brian Holden
NAC All-Conference First Team
NAC All-Tournament Team

Malik Rose
NAC All-Conference First Team
NAC All-Rookie Team
NAC All-Tournament Team
NAC Rookie of the Week (3)

References

Drexel Dragons men's basketball seasons
Drexel
1992 in sports in Pennsylvania
1993 in sports in Pennsylvania